Franklin (postcode: 2913) is a suburb of Canberra, Australia in the district of Gungahlin. It is named after the novelist Miles Franklin. The streets in Franklin are named after writers. It comprises an area of approximately 256 hectares. It is bounded by Flemington Road to the north and east, Well Station Drive to the south, and Gungahlin Drive to the west.
Franklin is mainly a residential area with higher density, mixed-use development along Flemington Road including a local shopping centre and other retail and commercial tenancies.

Open space
The suburb of Franklin includes a number of large open space to provide a pedestrian and cyclist network, and to provide an ecological corridor for the movement of native wildlife.
 The Gubur Dhaura Heritage Site provides 360 views of the surrounding landscape and an ochre quarry site which are of cultural significance to the Ngunnawal people. Remains of the Red Hill pipeclay mine, Old Well Station Track and historical markers can also be found here;
 The Mulangarri and North Mitchell Grasslands;
 The Gungaderra Creek;
 Old Well Station Track which connects the Well Station Heritage Precinct (located in the neighboring suburb of Harrison) with the Gungaderra Homestead, and Gubur Dhaura Red Hill Heritage Site through to the Gungahlin Town Centre.

Demographics

Transport

Light rail
Franklin is serviced by three Canberra Metro light rail stations located on Flemington Road at Manning Clark North, Mapleton Avenue and Nullarbor Avenue, that opened in April 2019.

Buses
Franklin is serviced by several ACTION bus routes.
18: Travels through Manning Clark Crescent
21 & 22: Travels through Hoskins Street, Oodgeroo Avenue and Nullarbor Avenue

Until the opening of the light rail, Flemington Road was serviced by 200 series buses every day.

Geology

Franklin is underlaid mostly by the Canberra Formation mudstone or volcanics from the late middle Silurian age.

Education
Franklin residents get preference for:
Franklin Early Childhood School
A shared PEA of Harrison School and Palmerston District Primary
Harrison School
Gungahlin College

References